Dambai College of Education is a teacher education college in Dambai (Krachi East District, Oti Region, Ghana). The college is located in Volta Zone. It is one of the about 40 public colleges of education in Ghana. The college participated in the DFID-funded T-TEL programme.

History 
Dambai College of Education was established on 28 August 1974 with the motto ‘SANKOFA’. The first principal was Mr. George Narh Bosumprah. The College opened with 31 students and 2 tutors. All the 31 students were males. Female students were admitted to the College in 1975. Mr. Ayensu, released his premises to house the first batch of students. A House in the college has been named after him.

The vision of the college is to become one of the best colleges in Ghana in the field of discipline, academic and professional competencies. Its mission is to provide comprehensive teacher education programme for students to acquire skills that would enable them become committed and dedicated teachers to improve the quality of teaching and learning in basic schools in Ghana. The College was established to run a 4-year Teacher's Certificate ‘A’ Course. It remained a 4-year Certificate ‘A’ College till 1989 when the Teacher's Certificate ‘A’ 3-year post secondary course was  introduced.

The college started the Diploma in Basic Education programme in October 2004. The first batch of the Diploma in Basic Education students came out in July 2007. The College continues to run general programme. In October, 2007 the College was given accreditation to tertiary level of education in Ghana. It offers sandwich programme for untrained teachers, for Diploma in Basic Education.

The College has four Halls of residence for students. The Halls are Volta, Ayensu and Oti for the male students and Unity Hall for the female students.

In 2007, the Professional Board of the University of Cape Coast commended the College for improving its performance significantly in external examinations conducted by the Institute of Education. In the field of sports and games, Dambai College of Education has put u impressive performance over the years. In 2006/2007 academic year the College came first in soccer and cross-country competitions among the seven colleges in the Volta Region. The government has provided the college with a GETFund modern multi-purpose classroom block, a Library Complex, and an 8-unit 4 storey flats for tutors.

References 

Colleges of Education in Ghana
Oti Region
Educational institutions established in 1974
1974 establishments in Ghana
Education in Volta Region